The National Collegiate Athletic Association (NCAA) Division I Football Bowl Subdivision (FBS) includes 130 teams. Each team has one head coach. In addition to the head coach, most teams also have at least one offensive coordinator and defensive coordinator; however, the head coach will sometimes assume one of these roles as well. FBS is composed of ten conferences: American Athletic Conference (The American), Atlantic Coast Conference (ACC), Big 12 Conference,  Big Ten Conference, Conference USA (C-USA), Mid-American Conference (MAC), Mountain West Conference (MW), Pac-12 Conference (Pac-12), Southeastern Conference (SEC), and Sun Belt Conference (SBC). All FBS schools except seven (Army, BYU, UConn, Liberty, UMass, New Mexico State, & Notre Dame) are members of one of these conferences.

In 2019, Kirk Ferentz of Iowa became the longest-continuous tenured head coach in Division I FBS. Ferentz began his current coaching tenure in 1999 and is the only FBS head coach who began his current head coaching position before the 2000 season. Three coaches had a previous head coaching stint at their current school: Mack Brown at North Carolina (1988-1997, 2019–present), Greg Schiano at Rutgers (2001-2011, 2020–present), Jeff Tedford at Fresno State (2017–2019, 2022–present), and Brady Hoke at San Diego State (2009–2011, 2020–present).

Coaches' records updated through the 2022 college football season.

Coaches

See also
 List of current NCAA Division I FCS football coaches
 List of current NCAA Division I baseball coaches
 List of current NCAA Division I men's basketball coaches
 List of current NCAA Division I women's basketball coaches
 List of current NCAA Division I men's ice hockey coaches
 List of NCAA Division I men's soccer coaches

Notes

References

 

FBS coaches
NCAA Division I FBS football coaches